Neelima Katiyar  is an Indian politician and the Minister of State in the Government of Uttar Pradesh. She was member of Uttar Pradesh Legislative Assembly.

Personal life
Nilima was born in Kalyanpur, Uttar Pradesh. She is the daughter of Prem Lata Katiyar a former minister in Uttar Pradesh.

Education
Katiyar earned M.A. and B.A. degrees from Kanpur University Chhatrapati Shahu Ji Maharaj University.

Political life
In 2017 she was elected as a Member of Legislative Assembly of Uttar Pradesh from Kalyanpur, Kanpur (Vidhan Sabha constituency) as a Bharatiya Janta Party candidate with 86620 votes in this election.

She has been appointed Minister of state in a Yogi Adityanath cabinet on 21 August 2019.

References

Living people
People from Kanpur
Uttar Pradesh MLAs 2017–2022
Bharatiya Janata Party politicians from Uttar Pradesh
1973 births
Women in Uttar Pradesh politics
Uttar Pradesh MLAs 2022–2027
21st-century Indian women politicians